The 2020 Indiana Hoosiers men's soccer team represents Indiana University Bloomington in men's college soccer during the 2020 NCAA Division I men's soccer season and 2020 Big Ten Conference men's soccer season. It was the 48th season the university fielded a men's varsity soccer program, and the 30th season the program played in the Big Ten Conference. Indiana played their home games at Bill Armstrong Stadium and were coached by 11th-year head coach, Todd Yeagley.

The season was originally scheduled to begin on August 28, 2020, and conclude on December 15, 2020; but was postponed to a February 19, 2021 start and May 17, 2021, end due to the COVID-19 pandemic.

Background 

The 2019 Indiana Hoosiers men's soccer team represented Indiana University Bloomington in men's college soccer during the 2019 NCAA Division I men's soccer season and 2019 Big Ten Conference men's soccer season. It was the 47th season the university fielded a men's varsity soccer program, and the 29th season the program played in the Big Ten Conference.

During the regular season Indiana completed the league double by winning both the Big Ten regular season, and the 2019 Big Ten Conference Men's Soccer Tournament, successfully repeating their 2018 successes. The Hoosiers were seeded fifth overall in the 2019 NCAA Division I Men's Soccer Tournament, where they reached the Third Round before losing to UC Santa Barbara.

Three Indiana players were selected in the 2020 MLS SuperDraft: Jack Maher was selected by expansion club, Nashville SC with the second overall pick. Simon Waever was drafted by Toronto FC late in the second round with the 51st overall pick. Joris Ahlinvi was selected early in the third round by FC Cincinnati with the 53rd overall pick. After one season with the Hoosiers, Aidan Morris signed a homegrown player contract with his parent MLS team, Columbus Crew.

Team information

Roster 
Players and squad numbers last updated on February 25, 2021. Appearances include all competitions.Note: Flags indicate national team as has been defined under FIFA eligibility rules. Players may hold more than one non-FIFA nationality.

Coaching staff

Player movement

Departures

Arrivals

Transfers

Competitive

Big Ten regular season

Results summary

Results by round

Match results

Big Ten Tournament

NCAA Tournament

Rankings

2021 MLS SuperDraft

References

External links 

                 

2020
2020 Big Ten Conference men's soccer season
American men's college soccer teams 2020 season
Indiana Hoosiers men's soccer
2020 NCAA Division I Men's Soccer Tournament participants
2020
2020